The 2014–15 Algerian Women's Championship was the 17th season of the Algerian Women's Championship, the Algerian national women's association football competition. Afak Relizane won the championship for the sixth time consecutively.

Teams
Afak Relizane
AS Sûreté Nationale
ASE Alger Centre
FC Constantine
JF Khroub
AS Intissar Oran
FC Béjaïa
USF Béjaïa

References

Algerian Women's Championship seasons